Brookswood Secondary School is located in the community of Brookswood in Langley, British Columbia. Among other resources, the school has an automechanics workshop, two gymnasiums, a theatre, a dark room, and a television studio. The school also offers a French Immersion program as well as Spanish and German.

History
On March 22, 1973, in response to overcrowding at H.D. Stafford Junior Secondary, a $1.5 million contract began the construction of a Brookswood Junior Secondary School (Grades 8-10); its students would move to Langley Secondary to graduate. The school was later enlarged to become a full (8-12) secondary school, and further renovations (including a second gym) were completed between 1995 and 1996.

Brookswood was one of a trio of Langley schools built from the same, or similar plans - designed to accommodate expansion. The others were R.E. Mountain Secondary and D.W. Poppy Secondary. After extensive renovations at all three schools, they are hardly recognizable as having evolved from the same plan. Brookswood (currently the largest of the three) and Poppy have both completed their courtyard enclosure, while Mountain remains closest to its original form.

Drama
Brookswood theatre department holds an annual drama festival "Showcase" with plays written by grade 12 students. These students are members of the Directing and Scriptwriting 12 class, of which the purpose is to write, cast, and direct a play during the school year. As well, Brookswood is host to acting and stage management classes for grades 9-12, and the classes frequently collaborate to put on productions for the school as well as the district and provincial drama festivals. Productions put on by the school include Mama Mia! and SpongeBob Squarepants.

Video production
Brookswood is home to Backstreet Studios, where teens in grades 9-12 are welcome to enroll in various video production programs. Many videos to come out of Backstreet have fared well in provincial student film festivals, with Brookswood being one of the top contenders in many categories year after year. Additionally, several film students have earned scholarships to VFS through their good performances at the student festivals.

Sports
Brookswood is prominent in BC Athletics, especially basketball. The Brookswood Bobcats are the three-time defending provincial champions in Senior Girls AAA Basketball. The Senior Boys Basketball team placed 4th in the 2006 AAA Provincials at the PNE Agrodome.  Other than basketball, Brookswood organizes a number of sports teams, including soccer, volleyball, swimming, curling, rugby, and hockey. Also, Brett Lawrie former Major League Baseball player , attended Brookswood.

Notable alumni
 Amanda Crew, actress
 Brett Lawrie, baseball player
 Danielle Lawrie, softball player
 Chelsea McMullan, filmmaker
 Carla Qualtrough, politician
 Daniel Wesley, musician

References

Sources
Langley Advance - Today in History

External links

High schools in British Columbia
Educational institutions established in 1973
School District 35 Langley
1973 establishments in British Columbia